Our (Perfect) Xmas Retreat is a 2021 internationally co-produced christmas comedy film directed by Macarena Astorga. It stars a choral cast made up of Loles León, Leo Harlem, María Barranco, David Guapo, Sara Sálamo, Carlos Alcántara, Mariam Hernández, Antonio Dechent, Luna Fulgencio, Rubén Fulgencio and Marco Ezcurdia. It was released on November 26, 2021 in Spain and in Peru on December 8.

Synopsis 
As if it were a Christmas story, two little brothers listen attentively by the fireplace to a new story from their grandfather, which may not be entirely a fantasy. In it, the story of a movie star in low hours and an emerging heartthrob who threatens to displace the previous one is told thanks to the tricks of their agent, the owner of the high mountain hotel and her crazy sister, promoter of a new and peculiar discipline that mixes yoga and fengshui, a group of children wanting to have fun, but also to discover hidden secrets, a taciturn bellboy who sees everything and a tremendous storm that will leave them isolated days before Christmas.

Cast

See also 
 List of Spanish films of 2021

References

External links 

 

2021 films
2021 comedy films
Spanish Christmas comedy films
Peruvian comedy films
Mexican comedy films
Argentine comedy films
Tondero Producciones films
Bowfinger International Pictures films
2020s Spanish-language films
2020s Spanish films
2020s Peruvian films
2020s Mexican films
2020s Argentine films
Mexican Christmas films